The South Carolina Science Olympiad Competition, often abbreviated as SCSO, is an annual Science Olympiad competition comprising middle school and high school teams across South Carolina. The competition was first held in the C Division (grades 9–12) in 1985, with the inaugural state champions being Irmo High School from Irmo. Bell Street Middle School from Clinton won the first B Division (grades 6–9) state championship a year later. The winners of the tournament represent South Carolina at the Science Olympiad National Tournament, held in May at various universities across the nation.

The current state champions are Clinton Middle School and Clinton High School, who won their 20th and 11th state championships, respectively, on April 2, 2022.

Dr. Jennifer Albert assumed the position of State Director for the 2019 season; she replaced Dr. Bret Clark.

History

The competition has been held every year since 1985 for Division C and since 1986 for Division B, with the exception of 2020, when the competition was canceled due to the COVID-19 pandemic.

 Indicates team won the national tournament.

Statistics

State Championships by School

BOLD denotes a national championship.

Results
Score is calculated by giving 1 point for a first-place finish, 2 points for a second-place finish, etc.
In final events standings, (D) denotes defending champions.

2022 Competition
Like the 2021 competition, the 2022 competition did not include regional competitions due to lingering uncertainties regarding the COVID-19 pandemic. The state competition marked a return to an in-person format and included the standard slate of 23 events. While the middle school tournament was initially scheduled for an earlier date, a lack of registered teams resulted in both the competitions for Division B and Division C taking place on April 2, 2022.

2021 Competition
The 2021 competition did not include regional competitions due to the COVID-19 pandemic. The state competition was the first to be held virtually, and only included a selection of 12, test-only events. Many hands-on portions of some events were also cut. A trial competition was held on January 23, 2021, to test the virtual format, though only four events were run, and the results had no bearing on the actual competition. The state competition for Division C took place on March 20, 2021, and the competition for Division B took place a week later on March 27, 2021.

2019 Competition
The 2019 competition was the first to feature regional competitions; teams were able to compete in whichever regional they prefer but were only allowed to compete in one. Regional competitions were held on February 23, 2019, at Newberry College and March 2, 2019, at The Citadel. The state competition was held on March 16, 2019, at The Citadel.

2018 Competition

2017 Competition

2016 Competition

2015 Competition
Both winners represented South Carolina at the 2015 Science Olympiad National Tournament, held at the University of Nebraska–Lincoln. Competition took place on May 15–16, 2015.

2014 Competition

References

Science competitions
Education in South Carolina
Science events in the United States
Science and technology in South Carolina
Annual events in South Carolina
1985 establishments in South Carolina
Recurring events established in 1985